The Battle of Lutterberg took place on 10 October 1758 during the Seven Years' War between a French force of 42,000 commanded by Charles, Prince of Soubise and a much smaller Anglo-German force commanded by General Christoph Ludwig von Oberg.

The two armies clashed near the town of Lutterberg, Lower Saxony. The 14,000 mostly Prussian Allied troops, were overwhelmed by several charges of French cavalry and were forced to withdraw. Despite having won a decisive victory, Soubise was slow to pursue the retreating enemy - causing his superiors in Paris to replace him with the Marquis de Contades.

Soubise earned a Marshal's baton for this victory. François de Chevert was decorated with the Grand Croix for his contributions in the battle.

Bibliography
 Duffy, Christopher. The Military Experience in the Age of Reason. Routledge & Kegan Paul, 1987.
 Jacques, Tony. The Dictionary of Battles and Sieges, F-O. Greenwood Press, 2007.

References

Battle of Lutterberg (1758)
Battles involving France
Battles of the Seven Years' War
Battles in Lower Saxony
1758 in the Holy Roman Empire